Joseph Jules Fauria (born January 16, 1990) is a former American football tight end. He was signed by the Detroit Lions as an undrafted free agent in 2013. He played college football at Notre Dame and UCLA. He also played for the Arizona Cardinals and the New England Patriots.

Early years
Fauria attended Crespi Carmelite High School in Encino, California. Fauria was named to the first-team all-state by CalHiSports.com. He was ranked the 7th best tight end prospect in the nation and was ranked the 24th prospect in the state of California by rivals.com.

College career
He played college football at Notre Dame and UCLA. On June 27, 2009, during his sophomore year, he was suspended by Notre Dame for "slapping a priest on the butt in jest", which led him to transfer to UCLA.  He finished college with a total of 88 receptions, 1,139 receiving yards, and 20 receiving touchdowns.

Professional career

Detroit Lions
Fauria went undrafted in the 2013 NFL Draft. On April 27, 2013, he signed with the Detroit Lions as a free agent.

Fauria made the Lions opening day roster. He scored a touchdown in his first regular season game with the team, on a one-yard pass from Matthew Stafford. In a Week 6 matchup against the Cleveland Browns, Fauria caught a career-high three touchdowns on three catches for 34 yards. He finished his rookie season with only 18 receptions, but seven of those resulted in a touchdown.

Fauria's 2014 season was limited due to an ankle injury. In seven games, Fauria had six receptions for 74 yards and one touchdown. His sole touchdown came against the Tampa Bay Buccaneers on December 7.

Arizona Cardinals
On September 10, 2015, Fauria was signed by the Arizona Cardinals. On September 19, 2015, he was released by the Cardinals. On September 23, 2015, Fauria was re-signed to the Cardinals' practice squad. On October 2, 2015, the Cardinals placed Fauria on the practice squad injured list. On October 13, 2015, the Cardinals waived Fauria from their practice squad injured list.

New England Patriots
On November 18, 2015, the New England Patriots signed Fauria to their practice squad. He was released on December 8, 2015.

Arizona Hotshots (AAF)
Fauria attempted a comeback with the Arizona Hotshots of the Alliance of American Football (AAF) in advance of the team and league's inaugural 2019 season but did not make the team's final roster on January 30, 2019.

Personal life
Fauria is the nephew of Christian Fauria, who was also an NFL tight end from 1995 to 2007. Fauria was born in Woodland Hills, California, to Christian Fauria's older sister, Julie Ann Fauria. At Crespi Carmelite High School in Encino, California, he was a three-sport athlete, lettering in football, basketball, and volleyball.

References

External links

Notre Dame Fighting Irish bio
UCLA Bruins bio
Detroit Lions bio

1990 births
Living people
UCLA Bruins football players
Players of American football from Los Angeles
American football tight ends
Detroit Lions players
Arizona Cardinals players
New England Patriots players
Notre Dame Fighting Irish football players